Preseka is a municipality in Croatia in the Zagreb County. According to the 2001, there are 1,670 inhabitants, absolute majority which are Croats.

References

Populated places in Zagreb County
Municipalities of Croatia

hu:Hétvezér